Mt. Zion Methodist Church is a historic church in rural Dallas County, Arkansas.  The church is located on County Road 407, roughly 2.5 miles northeast of Carthage.  The wood frame clapboarded structure was built c. 1910, and is virtually unaltered since its construction.  The main facade has two doors (traditionally one each for men and women), and features very simple vernacular styling.  The church is notable for its well-preserved interior.

The church was listed on the National Register of Historic Places in 1983.

Gallery

See also
National Register of Historic Places listings in Dallas County, Arkansas

References

Methodist churches in Arkansas
Churches on the National Register of Historic Places in Arkansas
Churches completed in 1910
Churches in Dallas County, Arkansas
National Register of Historic Places in Dallas County, Arkansas
1910 establishments in Arkansas